The tables below list Canada's 117 census agglomerations at the 2016 Census, as determined by Statistics Canada, up from 113 in the 2011 Census.

2016 changes 
Statistics Canada's review of CMAs and CAs for the 2016 Census resulted in the addition of eight new CAs and the demotion of two CAs, and the promotion of two CAs to census metropolitan areas (CMAs).

New census agglomerations 
Arnprior, Ontario
Carleton Place, Ontario 
Gander, Newfoundland and Labrador
Nelson, British Columbia
Sainte-Marie, Quebec
Wasaga Beach, Ontario
Weyburn, Saskatchewan
Winkler, Manitoba

Promotion to census metropolitan areas 
Belleville, Ontario
Lethbridge, Alberta

Retired census agglomerations 
Amos, Quebec
Temiskaming Shores, Ontario

Lists

Alberta 

Statistics Canada recognized fifteen census agglomerations within Alberta in the 2016 Census.

British Columbia 
Statistics Canada recognized 22 census agglomerations within British Columbia in the 2016 Census.

Manitoba 

Statistics Canada recognized five census agglomerations within Manitoba in the 2016 Census.

New Brunswick 
Statistics Canada recognized five census agglomerations within New Brunswick in the 2016 Census.

Newfoundland and Labrador 
Statistics Canada recognized four census agglomerations within Newfoundland and Labrador in the 2016 Census.

Northwest Territories 
Statistics Canada recognized one census agglomeration within the Northwest Territories in the 2016 Census.

Nova Scotia 
Statistics Canada recognized four census agglomerations within Nova Scotia in the 2016 Census.

Nunavut 
Statistics Canada recognized no census agglomerations within Nunavut in the 2016 Census.

Ontario 
Statistics Canada recognized 29 census agglomerations within Ontario in the 2016 Census.

Prince Edward Island 
Statistics Canada recognized two census agglomerations within Prince Edward Island in the 2016 Census.

Quebec 

Statistics Canada recognized 24 census agglomerations within Quebec in the 2016 Census.

Saskatchewan 
Statistics Canada recognized eight census agglomerations within Saskatchewan in the 2016 Census.

Yukon 
Statistics Canada recognized one census agglomeration within Yukon in the 2016 Census.

References 

Census agglomerations
Statistics Canada